Klusener is a surname. Notable people with the surname include:

Gonzalo Klusener (born 1983), Argentine footballer 
Lance Klusener (born 1971), South African cricket coach and former cricketer

See also
Kläsener
Cluysenaar